Raúl Salinas Lozano (born Agualeguas, Nuevo León; 1 May 1917 – 23 February 2004) was a Mexican economist. He was a former Secretary of Agriculture, Mexican Ambassador to the Soviet Union and father of former president Carlos Salinas de Gortari of the Institutional Revolutionary Party (PRI). He served as economics minister under José López Portillo.

Lozano studied economics at both the National Autonomous University of Mexico and Harvard University, where he earned as Masters degree. He returned to Mexico and taught at universities and served in a series of government positions.

Lozano was married to Margarita de Gortari Carvajal, with whom he had five children. Lozano's older son, Raúl Salinas de Gortari, was convicted of the murder of his sister Adriana's husband José Francisco Ruiz Massieu in 1999, although the sentence was overturned in June 2005. Lozano died of pneumonia at age 87.

References 

Mexican Secretaries of Economy
Mexican economists
Presidents of the Senate of the Republic (Mexico)
Ambassadors of Mexico to the Soviet Union
Institutional Revolutionary Party politicians
1917 births
2004 deaths
People from Agualeguas